This is a list of films which placed number one at the weekend box office for the year 2016 in Thailand.

References

Thailand
2016 in Thailand
2016